F.A.R is the fourth mini album by J-pop singer-songwriter Marie Ueda. It was released on February 20, 2019 under the Giza Studio label.

Promotion
The album was released in two editions, regular CD and limited CD+DVD. DVD consists of live footage Tatta Hitotsu no One-man Live Vol.3: Good-bye Stereotype with 12 tracks and documentary. This is Ueda's first album work since 2016 and first mini-album since 2012. The promotional and lead single, "Far", was released on January 16, 2019.

Previously released recording CD Revolver is as of now unreleased in album recordings. Wasurena ni Kuchizuke and commercial song Nagai Yoru was published in mini album W.A.H.

Ichigo no Mi was originally produced during Marie's indies times and received a recording version for the first time.

In the song "Softly," which is dedicated to Marie and Lala, Marie describes the priceless time she spends with Lala. On 28 July, was uploaded on YouTube channel Home Labo commercial video to promote new campaign Ie Tsukuri-Utau Tsukuri by using album track Softly.

The concept of the album is "the growth in adulthood" with intersects of nostalgia and anxiety.

Commercial performance
The album reached #26 on the Oricon Daily Album Charts. On Oricon Weekly Album Charts reached #47 rank.

Track listing

Personnel
Credits adapted from the Official Website.

Marie Ueda - vocals, songwriting
Akihito Tokunaga - arrange, bass, keyboards, chorus, programming
Daisuke Ikeda - strings arrange
Keisuke Kurumatani (Sensation) - drums
Seiichiro Iwai (formerly of U-ka Saegusa in dB) - guitar
Hiroshi Asai - bass, arrange
U-zo Ohkusu - keyboard, arrange

References

External links 
Special website for mini album F.A.R 

2019 albums
Being Inc. albums
Giza Studio albums
Japanese-language albums